Sean Andre Whitehead (born 7 March 1997) is a South African cricketer. He made his Twenty20 debut for Free State against Zimbabwe in the 2016 Africa T20 Cup on 9 September 2016. Prior to his Twenty20 debut, he was part of South Africa's squad for the 2016 Under-19 Cricket World Cup. He made his first-class debut for Free State in the 2016–17 Sunfoil 3-Day Cup on 8 December 2016.

In September 2018, he was named in Free State's squad for the 2018 Africa T20 Cup. In September 2019, he was named in Free State's squad for the 2019–20 CSA Provincial T20 Cup. In April 2021, he was named in South Western Districts' squad, ahead of the 2021–22 cricket season in South Africa. In November 2021, in the Division 2 match between South Western Districts and Easterns in the 2021–22 CSA 4-Day Series, Whitehead took all ten wickets in the second innings for South Western Districts, recording the second-best figures in a domestic first-class match in South Africa.

References

External links
 

1997 births
Living people
South African cricketers
Free State cricketers
Place of birth missing (living people)